New Canada is a town in Aroostook County, Maine, United States. The population was 310 at the 2020 census.

Geography

Demographics

2010 census
As of the census of 2010, there were 321 people, 115 households, and 88 families living in the town. The racial makeup of the town was 95.0% White, 0.3% Native American, and 4.7% from two or more races. Hispanic or Latino of any race were 1.9% of the population.

There were 115 households, of which 35.7% had children under the age of 18 living with them, 60.9% were married couples living together, 4.3% had a female householder with no husband present, 11.3% had a male householder with no wife present, and 23.5% were non-families. 15.7% of all households were made up of individuals, and 6.1% had someone living alone who was 65 years of age or older. The average household size was 2.79 and the average family size was 3.10.

The median age in the town was 41.3 years. 27.4% of residents were under the age of 18; 6.5% were between the ages of 18 and 24; 22.1% were from 25 to 44; 30.8% were from 45 to 64; and 13.1% were 65 years of age or older. The gender makeup of the town was 53.9% male and 46.1% female.

2000 census
As of the census of 2000, there were 306 people, 108 households, and 89 families living in the town.  The population density was 8.5 people per square mile (3.3/km).  There were 121 housing units at an average density of 3.4 per square mile (1.3/km).  The racial makeup of the town was 99.02% White, 0.33% African American and 0.65% Native American.

There were 108 households, out of which 38.9% had children under the age of 18 living with them, 73.1% were married couples living together, 1.9% had a female householder with no husband present, and 16.7% were non-families. 13.0% of all households were made up of individuals, and 5.6% had someone living alone who was 65 years of age or older.  The average household size was 2.83 and the average family size was 3.09.

In the town, the population was spread out, with 28.1% under the age of 18, 5.6% from 18 to 24, 32.7% from 25 to 44, 23.5% from 45 to 64, and 10.1% who were 65 years of age or older.  The median age was 34 years. For every 100 females, there were 102.6 males.  For every 100 females age 18 and over, there were 105.6 males.

The median income for a household in the town was $38,000, and the median income for a family was $39,500. Males had a median income of $30,962 versus $13,750 for females. The per capita income for the town was $15,415.  About 8.2% of families and 9.6% of the population were below the poverty line, including 16.1% of those under the age of eighteen and none of those 65 or over.

References

Towns in Aroostook County, Maine
Towns in Maine